Ademar Kammler (born 24 May 1970) is a Brazilian racewalker. He competed in the men's 20 kilometres walk at the 1992 Summer Olympics.

References

1970 births
Living people
Athletes (track and field) at the 1992 Summer Olympics
Brazilian male racewalkers
Olympic athletes of Brazil
Place of birth missing (living people)
20th-century Brazilian people